Juan Manuel Morales (born 19 December 1988) is an Uruguayan footballer who currently plays as a left back. He is the son of the former Uruguayan football striker Carlos María Morales.

External links

1988 births
Living people
Uruguayan footballers
Uruguayan expatriate footballers
Association football defenders
Montevideo Wanderers F.C. players
Sud América players
El Tanque Sisley players
Boston River players
Deportivo Saprissa players
Expatriate footballers in Costa Rica